The 1988 Pacific Tigers football team represented the University of the Pacific (UOP) in the 1988 NCAA Division I-A football season as a member of the Big West Conference.

The team was led by sixth-year head coach Bob Cope and played home games on campus at Stagg Memorial Stadium in Stockton, California. The stadium was renamed at homecoming on October 15. The Tigers finished with two wins and nine losses (2–9, 2–5 Big West), and were outscored 174–324.

Schedule

Notes

References

Pacific
Pacific Tigers football seasons
Pacific Tigers football